Melanerythrus mactans is a species of seed bug in the family Lygaeidae, found in Australia and Pacific Islands.

References

External links

 

Lygaeidae
Taxa named by Carl Stål
Insects described in 1867